La Vérité (French for 'the truth') may refer to:

Newspapers
La Vérité (Shanghai), French language radical socialist weekly newspaper published from Shanghai  1931
 La Vérité, anti-semitic journal of Jules-Paul Tardivel 1881
La Vérité (Trotskyist journal)
 La Vérité (Madagascar), Malagasy newspaper

Music
 La Verité (Classix Nouveaux album), 1992
 La Vérité (Niagara album), 1992
 La Vérité, a 1968 album and song by Guy Béart
 Vérité, American singer-songwriter

Other uses
 La Vérité (film), a 1960 film by Henri-Georges Clouzot
 The Truth (La Vérité), a 2019 film by  Hirokazu Kore-eda
 La Vérité sortant du puits (Truth Coming Out of Her Well), a painting by Jean-Léon Gérôme
 La Vérité, a painting by Jules Joseph Lefebvre
 La Verite (horse), swedish born trotter (2017–2022)